Jan Olschowsky (born 18 November 2001) is a German professional footballer who plays as a goalkeeper for Bundesliga club Borussia Mönchengladbach. He played for SV Glehn from 2008 to 2009 and has played for Borussia Mönchengladbach since 2009.

Club career 
Olschowsky began his football career in 2008 and in the youth of SV Glehn in the Glehn district of Korschenbroich.  In July 2009 he moved to Borussia Mönchengladbach and went through all the youth teams at the club. He played 29 games for the Mönchengladbach U17 team in the Under 17 Bundesliga and 27 games for the Mönchengladbach U19 selection in the Under 19 Bundesliga. On October 13, 2018, he made his debut for Borussia Mönchengladbach II in a 2–1 win over SV 19 Straelen at the age of 16, as the youngest goalkeeper in the Regionalliga West.

In July 2020, Olschowsky signed a professional contract with Borussia Mönchengladbach that runs until June 30, 2023.  On September 27, 2022, he made his debut in the first-team matchday squad. With both first-choice goalkeeper Yann Sommer and his substitute Tobias Sippel being unavailable due to injury, Olschowsky made his Bundesliga debut against VfL Bochum on 8 November 2022. Mönchengladbach lost the match by 2–1 and he was voted by fans as the club's player of the match.

International career 
Olschowsky has played for the German junior national teams at the U18, U19 and U20 levels.

References

External links 
 DFB Profile
 
 

Living people
2001 births
Association football goalkeepers
Bundesliga players
German footballers
Germany youth international footballers
Borussia Mönchengladbach II players
Borussia Mönchengladbach players